Under the Town is the second album by Australian folk singer-guitarist Holly Throsby. It was released on 20 July 2006 and peaked at No. 66 on the ARIA Albums Chart. At the ARIA Music Awards of 2006, Throsby was nominated in the 'Best Female Artist' category for Under the Town.

Track listing
 "Under the Town" – 2:22
 "Making a Fire" – 3:39
 "If We Go Easy" – 3:47
 "On Longing" – 3:10
 "I Worry Very Well" – 3:18
 "Come Visit" – 3:05
 "Swing On" – 3:53
 "Shoulders and Bends" – 3:39
 "What Becomes of Us" – 4:13
 "Only a Rake" – 3:56

Charts

References

2006 albums
Holly Throsby albums